Eileen Gordon (née Leatt; born 22 October 1946) is a former Labour Member of Parliament in the United Kingdom, who represented Romford from 1997 to 2001.

Early life and education
Gordon was born in Islington, the daughter of Charles and Margaret Rose Leatt (née Mallett). She was educated at Harold Hill Grammar School, Shoreditch Comprehensive School, and Westminster College, Oxford (Cert.Ed.).

Career
She worked as a teacher for the Mawney School in Romford. At the 1986 local elections, Gordon and her husband Tony were the Labour candidates for Collier Row, centred on the area of that name in Havering (part of the Romford constituency). However, both council seats were held by the Conservative Party.

Gordon was an assistant to the Labour MP for West Ham, Tony Banks, from 1990 to 1997.

She contested the Conservative-held seat of Romford for Labour at the 1992 general election, but was unsuccessful. In 1994, she stood for election to Havering Council again, this time for Gidea Park (named for the area of the same name).

The 1992 general election had been her party's fourth loss in a row, but in 1997, as part of the landslide victory spearheaded by party leader Tony Blair, Gordon won Romford, becoming the first Labour elected MP for the seat since 1970. Whilst in Parliament, she was a member of the Broadcasting Select Committee from 1998 to 2001, and the Health Select Committee, from 1999 to 2001.

However, despite Blair winning a second term as Prime Minister at the subsequent 2001 election, Gordon lost her seat to the Conservative candidate Andrew Rosindell. It was one of the few Labour losses at that election, which saw her party retain its large majority from the 1997 election.

Following her election defeat, she returned to work as a researcher for Tony Banks, who left the House of Commons at the 2005 general election, becoming a member of the House of Lords until his death in 2006.

Personal life
In 1969, Gordon married Tony Gordon; the couple had a son and daughter. Tony was elected to Havering Borough Council in 1990, representing Oldchurch in Romford until 1998. He died in 2005.

References

External links 
 

1946 births
Living people
Labour Party (UK) MPs for English constituencies
People from Romford
UK MPs 1997–2001
Politics of the London Borough of Havering
Female members of the Parliament of the United Kingdom for English constituencies
20th-century British women politicians
21st-century British women politicians
20th-century English women
20th-century English people
21st-century English women
21st-century English people
Alumni of Westminster College, Oxford